MaryGail K. Douglas is an American politician. She is a former member of the South Carolina House of Representatives from the 41st District, serving from 2013 to 2017. Douglas was preceded by H. Boyd Brown and succeeded by Annie McDaniel.

References

South Carolina politicians

Women state legislators in South Carolina
Year of birth missing (living people)
Living people